Momo Wandel Soumah (20 April 1977 – 13 February 2017) was a Guinean professional footballer who played as a forward. He played in 13 matches for the Guinea national football team from 1996 to 1998. He was also named in Guinea's squad for the 1998 African Cup of Nations tournament. Soumah died of a heart attack in 2017 during training to become a professional football referee.

References

External links
 
 

1977 births
2017 deaths
Guinean footballers
Association football forwards
Guinea international footballers
1998 African Cup of Nations players
AS Kaloum Star players
Étoile Sportive du Sahel players
ASC Jeanne d'Arc players
ASEC Mimosas players
Guinean expatriate footballers
Guinean expatriate sportspeople in Tunisia
Expatriate footballers in Tunisia
Expatriate footballers in Senegal
Guinean expatriate sportspeople in Ivory Coast
Expatriate footballers in Ivory Coast
Place of birth missing
Association football players who died while playing